Josef Dostál may refer to:

 Josef Dostál (botanist) (1903–1999), Czech botanist
 Josef Dostál (canoeist) (born 1993), Czech canoer